SMS Árpád  was a pre-dreadnought battleship built by the Austro-Hungarian Navy in the early 20th century. She was launched on 11 September 1901 as the second of three s. Along with her sister ships, she participated at the bombardment of Ancona during World War I. Due to a shortage of coal, she was soon decommissioned after the bombardment of Ancona and used as harbor defense ship for the remainder of the war. After the war, all of the Habsburg-class battleships were ceded to Great Britain as war prizes. She was scrapped in Italy in 1921.

Construction and layout 

Árpád was the second of three battleships of her class. Her hull was laid down on 10 June 1899 at the Stabilimento Tecnico Triestino shipyard in Trieste. Following more than two years of construction, she was launched on 11 September 1901. After final fitting-out work was finished, Árpád was fully ready for service and commissioned into the Austro-Hungarian Navy on 15 June 1903.

Freeboard was approximately  forward and about  aft. She also displaced . Once construction on her had finished and she was commissioned into the Navy, Árpád had a crew of 638 officers and enlisted men.

The hull for the ship was constructed from longitudinal and transverse steel frames, over which the outer hull plates were riveted into place. The hull incorporated a double bottom that ran for 63% of the ship's length. A series of watertight bulkheads also extended from the keel to the gun deck. Bilge keels were mounted on either side of the hull to reduce rolling and prevent her from capsizing. Árpád had a flush main deck that was planked with wood, while the upper decks were covered with linoleum or corticine.

Árpád had three  L/40 guns, two mounted in a twin turret forward and one mounted in a single turret aft of the main superstructure. The C 97-type guns were manufactured by Krupp in Germany. The main guns fired at a rate of between three and four  armor-piercing (AP) shells per minute. Her secondary armament consisted of twelve  SK L/40 guns in casemates. These guns could fire at 4–5 shells per minute. She was built with face-hardened chrome-nickel steel.

Service history

Peacetime 

Árpád took part in her first fleet maneuvers in mid-1903 with her sister ship Habsburg. The third sister, Babenberg, was commissioned in Summer 1904, and participated in successive fleet drills. Following a series of simulated war games pitting Árpád and her sister ships against the three  battleships, Árpád and the other two Habsburg-class ships became the I Battleship Division. This new division was active in the Mediterranean region. When Habsburg underwent a training cruise with the three Monarch-class battleships in January 1903, Árpád joined her the next year in a voyage around the Mediterranean Sea. With the commissioning of the s in 1906 and 1907, the Habsburg-class ships were transferred from the I to the II Battleship Division, and the three Monarch-class battleships were moved from the II to the III Battleship Division. In 1910–1911, Árpád had one of her superstructure decks removed to reduce weight.

World War I 

Early in World War I, Árpád was transferred to the Austro-Hungarian Navy's IV Division after the first new s came into service. The two German ships were stationed in the Mediterranean and were attempting to break out of the strait of Messina, which was surrounded by British vessels. After breaking out, the German ships planned to steam to Turkey. After the Germans successfully broke out of Messina, the Austro-Hungarian Navy was recalled. The fleet had by that time advanced as far south as Brindisi in southeastern coast of Italy. After Italy entered the war on the side of France and Great Britain, the Austro-Hungarian Navy bombarded several Italian port cities along the Adriatic coast. Árpád took part in the Bombardment of Ancona on 23 May 1915.

Due to a coal shortage, Árpád was later decommissioned and re-purposed as a harbor defense ship for the latter half of the war. Árpáds crew was transferred to man the new U-boats and aircraft. Following the war, Árpád, along with her sister ships, were awarded to Great Britain as war prizes. They were sold to Italy and broken up for scrap in 1921.

Footnotes 

Explanatory notes

Citations

References 

 
 
 
 
 
 
 
 

Habsburg-class battleships
Ships built in Trieste
1901 ships
World War I battleships of Austria-Hungary